Viscount  was a samurai of Satsuma Domain, general in the early Imperial Japanese Army, and a cabinet minister in Meiji period Japan. Part of Sophia University in Tokyo is located on the site of his house.

Biography

Military career
Born into a samurai family of Satsuma Domain (present day Kagoshima Prefecture, Takashima studied at the Han school Zōshikan. He fought in the Boshin War to overthrow the Tokugawa shogunate, and was a member of the personal guard of Emperor Meiji in 1869, and was named a chamberlain in 1871. With the creation of the Imperial Japanese Army in 1874, he was commissioned as a colonel and made commandant of the Kyododan (School for Non-commissioned Officers) in 1875.

In 1877, he was promoted to major general at the time of the Satsuma Rebellion and commanded the IJA 1st Detached Infantry Brigade against his former Satsuma clansmen. From 1879 to 1880, he was sent to Germany and France for further training. On his return, he was assigned command of the Kumamoto Garrison in late 1880, and the Osaka Garrison in 1881. In 1882, he was commander of Japanese forces during the Imo incident in Korea. He was promoted to lieutenant general in 1883. In 1884, Takashima was ennobled with the title of viscount (shishaku) under the kazoku peerage system.

Takashima resumed command of the Osaka Garrison from 1885, and was appointed the first commander of the Osaka-based IJA 4th Division after the reorganization of the Imperial Japanese Army into Divisions, based on reforms initiated by the Prussian general Jakob Meckel in 1888.

Political career
In 1891, Takashima was named Army Minister in the first cabinet of Prime Minister Matsukata Masayoshi.  He was appointed to the Privy Council the following year. A strong supporter of the 1895 Japanese invasion of Taiwan, Takashima subsequently served as the first Vice Governor-General of Taiwan after the First Sino-Japanese War. In 1896, at the request of Prime Minister Itō Hirobumi he established the Colonial Administration Department encourage Japanese investment and settlement in Taiwan.

From September 1896, Takashima resumed the post of Army Minister under the 2nd cabinet of Prime Minister Matsukata Masayoshi, holding that post until September 1898, when he retired from military service. He was appointed again to the Privy Council from 1899 to his death due to an Intracranial hemorrhage in 1916. His grave is at the Aoyama Cemetery in Tokyo.

Decorations
 1887 –  Grand Cordon of the Order of the Rising Sun
 1916 –  Order of the Rising Sun with Paulownia Flowers

Foreign
 1916 –  France, Legion of Honour, Commandeur

References

External links

Footnotes 

1844 births
1916 deaths
Samurai
Kazoku
People of Meiji-period Japan
Shimazu retainers
Military personnel from Kagoshima Prefecture
People of the Boshin War
Japanese generals
Members of the Government-General of Taiwan
Ministers of the Imperial Japanese Army
Recipients of the Order of the Rising Sun with Paulownia Flowers
Grand Cordons of the Order of the Rising Sun
Commandeurs of the Légion d'honneur
People from Kagoshima